John L. Woolford Jr. is an American biologist currently at Carnegie Mellon University and an Elected Fellow of the American Association for the Advancement of Science.

Woolford received his B.A in Chemistry from Rice University in 1971, and his Ph.D. from Duke University in 1976.

References

Year of birth missing (living people)
Living people
Fellows of the American Association for the Advancement of Science
Duke University alumni
Brandeis University alumni
21st-century American biologists